Death adder may refer to:

In herpetology:
 All members of the genus Acanthophis, a group of highly venomous elapids found in Australia and New Guinea

In fiction:
 Death Adder (character), a fictional supervillain from Marvel Comics
 Death Adder, a fictional antagonist in the Golden Axe series of video games.

Animal common name disambiguation pages